Little River Baptist Church is a historic Southern Baptist church located near Jenkinsville, Fairfield County, South Carolina. USA. It was built about 1845, and is a one-story, frame meeting house plan church. The church is a rectangular clapboard structure of Greek Revival design with Gothic Revival details in the front facade. The front gabled roof is supported by four octagonal columns on a raised platform. In the early 1950s, a wing was added to provide Sunday School rooms and kitchen facilities.

It was added to the National Register of Historic Places in 1972.

References

Baptist churches in South Carolina
Churches on the National Register of Historic Places in South Carolina
Greek Revival church buildings in South Carolina
Churches completed in 1845
19th-century Baptist churches in the United States
Churches in Fairfield County, South Carolina
National Register of Historic Places in Fairfield County, South Carolina
Southern Baptist Convention churches
Wooden churches in South Carolina